Héctor Fabio Ballesteros Vélez  (born October 18, 1981 in Cali, Valle del Cauca) is a retired male weightlifter from Colombia. He won a gold medal for his native South American country at the 2003 Pan American Games, and competed at the 2004 Summer Olympics.

References
Profile

1981 births
Living people
Sportspeople from Cali
Colombian male weightlifters
Olympic weightlifters of Colombia
Weightlifters at the 2003 Pan American Games
Weightlifters at the 2004 Summer Olympics
Pan American Games gold medalists for Colombia
Pan American Games medalists in weightlifting
Medalists at the 2003 Pan American Games
20th-century Colombian people
21st-century Colombian people